Battle of Smolensk may refer to:

 Battle of Smolensk (1812), during Napoleon's invasion of Russia
 Battle of Smolensk (1941), encirclement and capture of the Soviet 16th and 20th armies by German Army Group Centre
 Battle of Smolensk (1943), recapture of the city by the Soviet 39th, 43rd and 10th Guards armies

See also 
 Siege of Smolensk (disambiguation)